Karin Vexman (born December 16, 2001 in Israel) is an Israeli individual and group rhythmic gymnast. She is the 2020 European Group All-around champion.

Career
In 2018, she joined Israeli senior group. They placed 6th in Group All-around at the 2019 World Championships in Baku, Azerbaijan.

In November 2020, they won gold medal at the 2020 European Championships in Group All-around and silver in Team and 5 balls competitions.

References

External links
 
 
 

Israeli rhythmic gymnasts
2001 births
Living people
Medalists at the Rhythmic Gymnastics European Championships
Gymnasts at the 2020 Summer Olympics
Olympic gymnasts of Israel